Michael Salazar (born 15 November 1992) is a professional footballer who currently plays for USL Championship side Miami FC. Born in the United States, he represents the Belize national team.

Career

College and Amateur
Salazar began his collegiate career at California Baptist University. In his freshman year in 2011, Salazar made a total of 20 appearances, starting seven of them, and finished tied for the team lead with 11 goals and was the team leader with 28 points. His strong performances saw him named the Pacific West Conference freshman of the year and named to the All-PacWest second team.  He also led the Lancers to a Pacific West Conference championship and helped the Lancers finish with the most wins in program history. To top if off, Salazar helped Cal Baptist win the National Christian College Athletic Association (NCCAA) national championship, with Salazar scoring twice in the final.  In his sophomore year, Salazar made 19 appearances and finished with six goals and led the team with six assists. He was once again named to the All PacWest Second Team.  The Lancers their second straight national NCCAA title with Salazar picking up 2 assists in the final.  After two seasons at California Baptist, Salazar transferred to UC Riverside on 10 June 2013.

In Salazar's first match with the Highlanders, he scored 3 goals and picked up 1 assist. He would lead the team with 6 goals and was named to the All Big-West First Team. In 2015, Salazar scored 6 goals, this time good enough for the second most on the team, and was once again named to the All Big-West First Team.

Salazar also played with amateur club OC Pateadores Blues in 2014 and PSA Elite in 2014 and 2015. Salazar scored 3 goals in 4 appearances for PSA Elite during the 2015 US Open Cup, earning him the 2015 Lower Division Player of Tournament award.

Montreal Impact
Salazar was selected in the second round (24th overall) of the 2016 MLS SuperDraft by Montreal Impact. He attracted favorable attention when he scored a goal for the Impact during a pre-season friendly match against D.C. United. He signed his first MLS contract on March 1, 2016. Salazar started the season by making 2 starts with Montreal's USL affiliate FC Montreal. Salazar made his MLS and Impact debut on 7 May 2016 when he came on as a substitute in a 4–4 draw with the Columbus Crew On 1 June he scored his first professional goal in a 4–2 loss to Toronto FC in the first leg of the Canadian Championship semifinals. Salazar made his first MLS start on 2 July and scored his first and second career MLS goals to help give the Impact a 3–2 win over the New England Revolution.

On 2 May 2017 Salazar was loaned to the Impact's USL affiliate Ottawa Fury FC after only making 2 substitute appearances in the Impact's first 9 matches. He made his Fury debut on 6 May in a 0–0 draw with the Tampa Bay Rowdies and scored his first goal for the Fury on 20 May in a 4–3 win over New York Red Bulls II. Salazar's strong performance's with the Fury saw him return to the impact after 4 appearances with Ottawa. He picked up his first goal of the season for the Impact on 5 July in a 1–3 loss to the Houston Dynamo. Salazar would also manage to put the ball in the net in Montreal's next two games, scoring and picking up an assist against the Philadelphia Union on 19 July in a 2–1 win and scoring in a 1–2 loss to FC Dallas on 22 July.

On 28 February 2018 Salazar was loaned to Ottawa for a second spell. In the Fury's first game of the 2018 season, Salazar picked up an assist in a 1–4 defeat to the Charlotte Independence. After making 4 appearances for Ottawa, Salazar suffered a knee injury that forced him to miss the rest of the season.

Salazar was released by Montreal at the end of their 2018 season.

In early 2019, Salazar went on trial with USL Championship club Birmingham Legion FC and scored a goal for them in a 3–1 victory in a friendly against the Chattanooga Red Wolves on 13 February 2019 However, he was not offered a contract with the Legion.

Rio Grande Valley FC
On 14 March 2019, Rio Grande Valley FC announced that Salazar has signed with the club for the 2019 USL Championship season. He made his Toros debut on 16 March, coming on as a sub in a 2–0 loss to Fresno FC. He scored his first goal for RGVFC on 13 April in a 2–1 win over Oklahoma City Energy FC. On 24 April Salazar came on as a sub and scored 3 goals to help give the Toros a 4–4 draw with LA Galaxy II. He was named to the USL Championship Team of the Week in honor of his performance against LA Galaxy II. Salazar scored again against LA Galaxy II on 18 May to help RGVFC secure a 2–2 draw. In the Toros next match, Salazar would score a brace against San Antonio FC to help give RGVFC a 3–1 win. He was named to his second USL Championship Team of the Week as a result.  Salazar scored against Real Monarchs on 8 June in a Toros 3–5 loss. His 8 goals set a RGVFC single season record for league goals

Houston Dynamo 
On 10 June 2019, Salazar signed with RGVFC's parent MLS club the Houston Dynamo.  He made his Dynamo debut on 11 June, coming on as a substitute in a 3–2 win over Austin Bold in the US Open Cup.  Salazar made his first league appearance for the Dynamo on 22 June, coming on as a sub in a 4–0 loss to the Portland Timbers. On 29 June, he made his first start for Houston in a 2–1 defeat to the New England Revolution.  After failing to score in 10 appearances with the Dynamo, Salazar was sent back to RGVFC on loan, where he would score 2 goals in 12 appearances.

For 2020, Salazar remained with the Dynamo, but only made one appearance all year, a 13-minute substitute appearance against Sporting Kansas City in a 4–0 loss.

His contract option was declined by Houston following their 2020 season.

Memphis 901
On 12 April 2021, Salazar signed with USL Championship side Memphis 901 FC.  He made his debut for Memphis on 15 May, playing the full 90 minutes in a 1–0 loss to the Birmingham Legion.  Salazar scored his first goal for Memphis on 5 June in a 2–1 win over Indy Eleven.  He ended the regular season with 32 appearances, 6 goals, and 2 assists, helping Memphis finish 3rd in the Central Division and qualify for the playoffs.  In Memphis's playoff game, Salazar came on as a substitute in the first half in a 3–1 loss to the Charlotte Independence.

LA Galaxy II
On 3 March 2022, it was announced that Salazar had signed with USL Championship side LA Galaxy II ahead of their final USL season before the club moved to the MLS Next Pro.

Miami FC
On 3 January 2023, Salazar signed with USL Championship side Miami FC for their 2023 season.

International
On 11 June 2013, Salazar made his international debut for Belize in a 0–0 draw against Guatemala.  Two weeks later, he was named to their 23-man roster for the 2013 CONCACAF Gold Cup. Salazar would appear in all 3 of Belize's games at the 2013 Gold Cup and all 5 of their games at the 2017 Copa Centroamericana.  Salazar scored his first goal for Belize in a 4–2 win over Grenada in a friendly on 22 March 2018. He scored his second international goal on 17 November 2019 in a 3–2 loss to Grenada in a CONCACAF National League match.

Personal life 
Salazar was born in New York City, New York, but moved along with his parents to their native Belize shortly after birth. He grew up in Cayo, Belize. After living in Belize for 18 years, Salazar and his family moved to Moreno Valley, California where he attended Canyon Springs High School for his senior year.

Career statistics

Club

International

International goals
Scores and results list Belize's goal tally first.

References

External links

California Baptist University bio
UC Riverside Highlanders bio

1992 births
Living people
People with acquired Belizean citizenship
Belizean footballers
Belizean expatriate footballers
Belize international footballers
American soccer players
UC Riverside Highlanders men's soccer players
OC Pateadores Blues players
CF Montréal players
FC Montreal players
Ottawa Fury FC players
People from Cayo District
Rio Grande Valley FC Toros players
Houston Dynamo FC players
Memphis 901 FC players
LA Galaxy II players
Miami FC players
Expatriate soccer players in Canada
USL League Two players
Major League Soccer players
USL Championship players
2013 CONCACAF Gold Cup players
2017 Copa Centroamericana players
CF Montréal draft picks
California Baptist Lancers men's soccer players
American people of Belizean descent
Association football forwards
Belize youth international footballers